Song of Tomorrow may refer to:

Song of Tomorrow (1967 film), a Hong Kong film directed by Doe Ching
Song of Tomorrow (2010 film), a Swedish film directed by Jonas Bergergård and Jonas Holmström

See also
A Song for Tomorrow, a 1948 British film